was a district located in Gifu, Japan. All towns and villages in the district merged to form the city of Gero on March 1, 2004, and the district no longer exists as an independent entity.

 , the district had an estimated population of 40,102 and a population density of 47.1 persons per km2. The total area was 851 km2.

District Timeline
 April 1, 1950-The district transferred the villages of Asahi and Takane to Ōno District (both of the villages were later merged into the city of Takayama on February 1, 2005).
 March 1, 2004-The district dissolved when all municipalities within the district merged to form the city of Gero.
 Gero (town)
 Hagiwara
 Kanayama
 Osaka
 Maze

Former districts of Gifu Prefecture